Adefolarin Adebayo Orimolade (born November 23, 1995) is a professional Canadian football defensive lineman for the Toronto Argonauts of the Canadian Football League (CFL).

College career
Orimolade played college football for the Dartmouth Big Green from 2013 to 2016. He played in 39 games where he had 143 total tackles, 23.5 sacks, 10 forced fumbles, and eight pass breakups.

Professional career

Los Angeles Rams
Orimolade signed as an undrafted free agent with the Los Angeles Rams on May 2, 2017. However, he was released at the end of training camp on September 2, 2017.

Calgary Stampeders
On May 11, 2018, it was announced that Orimolade had signed with the Calgary Stampeders. He began the 2018 season on the practice roster, but made his professional debut in Week 3 against the Ottawa Redblacks on June 28, 2018. In his second game, on July 28, 2018, he recorded his first career sack against the Saskatchewan Roughriders. He played in ten regular season games for the Stampeders in 2018 where he had seven defensive tackles, 10 special teams tackles, two sacks, and two forced fumbles. He made his post-season debut in the West Final against the Winnipeg Blue Bombers that year and also played in his first Grey Cup game. In the 106th Grey Cup, he recorded two special teams tackles as the Stampeders defeated the Redblacks and Orimolade won his first championship.

In the first pre-season game of 2019, Orimolade endured a quadriceps injury and spent the entire season on the injured list. He also did not play in 2020 due to the cancellation of the 2020 CFL season. He returned in 2021 where he played in seven regular season games and had eight defensive tackles, one special teams tackle, and two sacks. He also played in the West Semi-Final loss to the Saskatchewan Roughriders. As a pending free agent, Orimolade signed a contract extension on January 5, 2022.

During the 2022 season, Orimolade recorded his first interception on August 13, 2022, after picking off the BC Lions' Nathan Rourke and returning it 28 yards for his first career touchdown. He played in 17 regular season games where he had 37 defensive tackles, six sacks, one interception, one forced fumble, and one touchdown. He became a free agent upon the expiry of his contract on February 14, 2023.

Toronto Argonauts
On the first day of free agency, on February 14, 2023, it was announced that Orimolade had signed with the Toronto Argonauts.

Personal life
Orimolade was born to parents Taiye and Ibijola Orimolade and has one brother.

References

External links
 Toronto Argonauts bio

1996 births
Living people
American football defensive linemen
Calgary Stampeders players
Canadian football defensive linemen
Dartmouth Big Green football players
Los Angeles Rams players
Players of American football from Washington, D.C.
Toronto Argonauts players